Dad Made Dirty Movies is a 2011 Bulgarian-German documentary film by Jordan Todorov following Stephen C. Apostolof's life and  career. The film premiered at Visions du Réel International Film Festival in April 2011 and consists of archive footage as well as interviews with Apostolof's family, friends and associates.

The film also includes never before seen archive footage from making of Orgy of the Dead - Apostolof's most well known film. The title Dad Made Dirty Movies comes from a quote by Polly Apostolof, one of Apostolof's daughters.

Synopsis
Dad Made Dirty Movies chronicles Stephen C. Apostolof's rise, from the story of his escape as a refugee from the Soviet occupation of Eastern Europe, to producer and director of sexploitation films in the 1960s and 1970s, his turbulent relationship with infamous Ed Wood and his downfall in the late 1970s with advent of hardcore pornography.

Production
The documentary is produced by Bulgarian company AGITPROP in association with Filmtank (Hamburg), ZDF and Arte. Pre-production phase took about five years. Principal photography began in New York City in December 2009, and continued in California, Nevada and Arizona in May, 2010.

Dad Made Dirty Movies features interviews with Apostolof's children and his third wife Shelley, stars from his films, cult filmmakers, film critics and film historians. The film uses first-person unreliable narrator based on authentic interviews with Apostolof, drawing heavily on his peculiar manner of speaking full of colloquialisms, puns and self irony.

Release
The film showed at the Franco-German television Arte on 17 February 2011 and had its official premiere on 10 April 2011 at Visions du Réel International Film Festival. In all, Dad Made Dirty Movies was an official selection of over thirty international film festivals including Transilvania International Film Festival, Planet Doc Review Festival, Sydney Underground Film Festival, Kansas International Film Festival, Trieste Film Festival, Mumbai International Film Festival etc.

The film often played as a double bill along with Orgy of the Dead - Apostolof's most popular film. Dad Made Dirty Movies was also aired on various TV channels as Arte, SBS One (Australia), Canvas (Belgium), Yle Teema (Finland) and it is going to be released on DVD in 2012 by Mindjazz Pictures (Germany). Dad Made Dirty Movies aired on HBO Central Europe in October 2012.

Critical reception
The film received favorable reviews by critics. Boyd Van Hoeij of Variety called it a "shoo-in for midnight screenings," going on to describe its tone as "generally upbeat, funny and interesting, with a good eye and ear for the times." Other reviewers also played up the zeitgeist angle of the film, including Screen Dailys Mark Adams who said that Dad Made Dirty Movies "does a great job in capturing the feel of the era," adding that "fans of cult exploitation films of the late 1960s and early 1970s will relish this engagingly balanced delve into the work of Stephen C. Apostolof." Tim Elliott of The Age wrote that "Stephen C. Apostolof's life is one of the great postwar American stories, a rollicking tale of rebellion, adventure and female breasts" concluding that "this zesty tribute explores Apostolof's life with suitable scepticism and humour."

Cast
(in order of appearance)
 Susan Apostolof as herself
 Polly Apostolof as herself
 Steve Apostolof as himself
 Christopher D. Apostolof as himself
 Shelley Apostolof as herself
 Harvey Shane as himself
 Greg Goodsell as himself
 Rudolph Grey as himself
 Ted V. Mikels as himself
 Nadejda Klein as herself
 David Ward as himself
 Ed Wood as himself (archive footage)
 Kathleen O'Hara as herself (archive footage)
 The Amazing Criswell as himself (archive footage)
 Tor Johnson as himself (archive footage)
 Marsha Jordan as herself (archive footage)
 James E. Myers as himself (archive footage)
 Rene Bond as herself (archive footage)
 Pat Barrington as herself (archive footage)
 Billy Graham as himself (archive footage)
 Lyndon Johnson as himself (archive footage)
 David F. Friedman as himself (archive footage)
 Patricia J. Rudl as herself (archive footage)
 Tim Burton as himself (archive footage)
 Johnny Depp as himself (archive footage)
 Kate Moss as herself (archive footage)
 Lisa Marie as herself (archive footage)
 Martin Landau as himself (archive footage)
 Sarah Jessica Parker as herself (archive footage)

Movies referenced
A list of movies referenced within Dad Made Dirty Movies.

Journey to Freedom,			1957
Orgy of the Dead,			1965
Suburbia Confidential,			1966
The Bachelor's Dreams,			1967
College Girls,			        1968
Motel Confidential,			1969
Lady Godiva Rides,			1969
The Divorcee,			        1969
Class Reunion,			        1972
The Snow Bunnies,			1972
The Beach Bunnies,			1976
Hot Ice,			1978
Love Is a Four Letter Word,			1966
Plan 9 from Outer Space,		1958
Glen or Glenda,			1953
The Trip,		1967
American Fever,			1979
Record City,			        1978
Midwest Holiday,			1952
In the Suburbs,			1957
Topkapi,		1964
Tom Jones,	1963
Deep Throat,	1972
The Devil in Miss Jones,		1973
The Green Slime,			1968
Heaven with a Gun,			1969
Ed Wood,		1994

Awards
 3rd Bulgarian Film Academy Awards 2012
 Best Television Documentary
 Sofia International Film Festival 2012
 The Young Jury Award for Best Documentary Film

Nominations
 Jihlava International Documentary Film Festival 2011
 Silver Eye Award for Best Mid-length Documentary Film
 The London Archive Film Festival 2014
 FOCAL Award for Best Use of Footage in a Feature Length Documentary

References

External links
 

Official trailer at Vimeo
"Variety" review of Dad Made Dirty Movies
"Screen Daily" review of Dad Made Dirty Movies
 

2011 films
2011 documentary films
German documentary films
Bulgarian documentary films
Documentary films about film directors and producers
Documentary films about American pornography
2010s English-language films
2010s American films
2010s German films